Rita Forst (born 31 March 1955) is a German automotive engineer and executive with General Motors Europe (GM Europe).

Early life
She was born in Wiesbaden, in Hesse in western Germany. She studied Mechanical Engineering at Darmstadt University of Applied Sciences (Hochschule Darmstadt Maschinenbau, a fachhochschule).

Career
She started her career in engineering in 1977.

General Motors
In 1997 she became Project Manager for the new GM Family II engine range. She was responsible for the GM Ecotec engine (L850).

GM Powertrain Torino was established in Turin in 2005, and the whole division employs around 10,000 people. In September 2005 she was named as Executive Director of Product Engineering at GM Powertrain Europe.

From 2010 until 2012 she was the overall head of Engineering (Entwicklungschefin of research & development) at GM Europe. She has also held positions at Opel and subsidiaries of General Motors.

Personal life
She is married and has two sons.

References

External links
 GM Europe profile

1955 births
General Motors people
German automotive engineers
German women engineers
People from Wiesbaden
Living people
20th-century German engineers
21st-century German engineers
20th-century women engineers
21st-century women engineers
Engineers from Hesse
20th-century German women
21st-century German women
Women automotive engineers